Peter Pan is an Australian 50-minute direct-to-video animated film from Burbank Films Australia.  It was originally released in 1988. The film is based on J. M. Barrie's 1911 novel Peter and Wendy adapted by Paul Leadon, which was in turn based on the 1904 play Peter Pan; or, the Boy Who Wouldn't Grow Up. Peand was adapted by Paul Leadon. The film was produced by Roz Phillips and featured music composed by John Stuart.  The copyright in this film is now owned by Pulse Distribution and Entertainment and administered by digital rights management firm NuTech Digital.

Plot 
Every night before going to sleep, the Darling children, Wendy, John, and Michael, are told stories by their mother of wonderful adventures in fantasy worlds; many of these stories tell of a boy named Peter Pan, who lives in a place called Neverland who never grows up.  One night, when Mr. and Mrs. Darling go out, leaving the children under the care of a house maid and Nana, the nursery dog, Wendy Darling is thrilled when the real Peter Pan flies right into their window.  In a previous visit, Nana had taken Peter Pan's shadow away from him, and now he and his fairy friend Tinker Bell have returned to claim it.  Nana has been punished by Mr. Darling, accused of breaking a valuable glass jar in the attempt to protect the children from Peter, and kept outdoors.  Peter Pan and Wendy become friends, and Peter confesses that he had visited many times to listen to Mrs. Darling's bedtime stories.  John and Michael wake up and Peter invites them all to follow him to Neverland.  With the use of fairy dust, the three children are able to fly, and they fly out to Neverland.  Once in Neverland, Peter Pan tells the children of evil Captain Hook, whose right hand was cut off by Peter and thrown to the crocodile some time before, who now wants to eat the rest of him. Hook plots revenge against Peter for this.  Meanwhile, Peter introduces the children to the Lost Boys, a group of young motherless children. He presents Wendy as their loving mother as long as she remains in Neverland, which she meekly resists.  Many adventures follow, as Peter Pan, the children and the Lost Boys battle against Captain Hook, save Wendy from his wicked intentions, and rescue the young Indian Princess Tiger Lily while Hook gets chased by the ticking crocodile. After all the excitement, Wendy announces that it is time to return home, and she invites the Lost Boys to come along, so that they may be returned to their real mothers. Smee, one of Captain Hook's pirates, follows the children, and he too is reunited with his mother. Wendy, John and Michael invite Peter Pan to stay with them in their home in London, but Peter Pan refuses, for that would mean he would have to grow up, something he would never want to do. They part, but Peter Pan welcomes them to return to Neverland someday.

Cast
 Jaye Rosenberg as Peter Pan and Mrs. Darling
 Phillip Hinton as Captain Hook and Mr. Darling
 Keith Scott as Smee
 Daniel Floyd as John Darling/Toodles/Nibbs/Slightl/Curly/The Twins
 Carol Adams as Michael Darling/Mother
 Olivia Martin as Wendy Darling/Tiger Lily
 Michael Anthony as Quenton
 Ben Brennan as additional voices

See also 
 Peter and Wendy
 J. M. Barrie
 Burbank Films Australia

References

External links 
 
 
 Peter Pan at the Big Cartoon DataBase
 http://neverpedia.com/pan/Peter_Pan_(1988_film)

1988 direct-to-video films
1988 animated films
1988 films
1980s adventure films
1988 fantasy films
Australian animated feature films
1980s children's adventure films
1980s children's fantasy films
Australian fantasy adventure films
Australian films based on plays
Peter Pan films
Films based on multiple works
Animated films based on children's books
1980s Australian animated films
1980s English-language films